is a Formula One video game endorsed by Satoru Nakajima that was released in 1992 for the Mega Drive/Genesis, Nintendo Entertainment System, and Nintendo Game Boy. The North American and European versions of the game are known as Ferrari Grand Prix Challenge in reference to Ferrari, specifically their Formula One team.

Gameplay

Mega Drive/Genesis version
The Mega Drive version of the game includes a Grand Prix mode, a free practice mode, and a time attack mode. The team and player names are close to the real thing without violating copyright laws. Either one or two players can compete and the game has a password method of saving the game. In addition to traditional tracks used in the  season (although both versions of the game features teams from the  season), the player can also play in bonus race tracks. Autopolis, Fuji Speedway, an oval training course, and a treacherous road course originally designed by the programmers of the video game used in the Japanese version.

It is one of only three Mega Drive games that supports the AX-1E analog controller.

The North American version uses the former location of the Long Beach Grand Prix, the Mid-Ohio Sports Car Course, Oyster Bay (as the name of the fictional track), and the Indianapolis Motor Speedway as American-specific substitutes for the tracks considered "local" to Japanese audiences. However, the graphics used for the backgrounds are identical to each other in both versions of the game. Additionally, the team names were altered so that Scuderia Ferrari is explicitly named such to match the title of the localized game, and the courses reflected the  season instead of the  season the Japanese version had.

NES and Game Boy versions
The title Ferrari Grand Prix Challenge was also ported for the Game Boy and Nintendo Entertainment System. It was developed by System 3 and published by Acclaim in North America and Europe. Coconuts Japan published the game in Japan under the title .

The Nintendo Entertainment System version of the game is a simplified version that allows players to practice up to six laps or qualify for every Formula One race of the season using metric units (kilometres per hour instead of miles per hour). It was one of the few 8-bit Formula One video games to adequately represent the Circuit Gilles Villeneuve as having an urban background along with several other urban race tracks represented in the 1990 Formula One season with the exception that Circuit de Catalunya is presented in this version as the round in Spain, although Jerez hosted the 1990 Spanish Grand Prix. Tire wear is possible resulting in trips to the pit crew for maintenance and repairs. A radio allows communication with the crew chief; he will advise whether repairs are necessary. The top speed of the vehicle is 335 kilometres per hour and turbo is not used in the game.

Before the first qualifying session can take place, the player must insert his name and his nationality. The name can be up to 10 characters long and the country has to fit into a three-character field. Since the game doesn't verify if the three-letter code matches up to a real nationality, it doesn't matter if the player makes up a nationality for a fictional country.

References

1992 video games
Satoru Nakajima video games
Acclaim Entertainment games
Coconuts Japan games
Formula One video games
Game Boy games
Sega Genesis games
Nintendo Entertainment System games
Varie games
Video games developed in Japan
Video games scored by Mark Cooksey
Video games set in 1990
Video games set in 1992